Teslin is a waterproof synthetic printing medium manufactured by PPG Industries.  Teslin is a single-layer, uncoated film, and extremely strong. Its official website states that it is recyclable and non-toxic. The strength of the lamination peel of a Teslin sheet is 2-4 times stronger than other coated synthetic and coated papers.  Available thicknesses run from 7 mil to 18 mil, though only sizes 10 mil and 14 mil are sized at 8.5" by 11" for printing with most consumer printers.  Also available are perforated versions, specifically, 1up, 2up, 3up, 6up, and 8up.

Teslin is commonly used for producing waterproof maps, door hangers, flash cards, horticultural tags, parking permits, and more.

Teslin is also widely used in the plastic gift and loyalty card industry.  In 1984, the first Teslin-based plastic card was produced by Ron Goade, done through laminating the Teslin substrate after having been printed on and then cutting multiple cards out of the laminated sheet of Teslin.

Teslin Grades
There are various grades of Teslin available, each with their own use case depending on printing method and end use. Most grades of Teslin can be used with an offset press, but other types of printing require their own grades to ensure compatibility. Teslin grades are referred to as a letter and number designation (e.g. "SP 1000"). The letters are the type of Teslin, and the numbers represent the thickness where 1000 is 10 mil, 600 is 6 mil, 700 is 7 mil, etc.

SP Grade
The Synthetic Printing (SP) grade of Teslin is the standard grade of Teslin. It's ideally used with an offset press or pigment-based inks in an inkjet printer. It should not be used with dye-based inks. Because this is the standard grade of Teslin, it is available in the greatest number of thicknesses: 6 mil, 7 mil, 8 mil, 10 mil, 12 mil and 14 mil.

SPID Grade
The Synthetic Printing (SPID) grade of Teslin is ideal for use with laser printers. SPID grade is coated on both sides to enable the sheets to be fed into and through laser printers and copiers. It is normally available in 10 and 14 mil thicknesses.

IJ-WP Grade
The IJ-WP grade of Teslin is specifically made for use in both dye- and pigment-ink-based inkjet printers. It should not be used in any other print process. The only standard version of IJ-WP Teslin is IJ1000WP (10 mil thick). IJ-WP Teslin is coated on both sides to allow ink to set. Like all other grades of Teslin®, it is waterproof once the ink has set. This grade of Teslin is most popular for creating waterproof maps and signage.

Digital Grade
The Digital grade of Teslin is made to be used in digital printing presses. It is available in 10 mil thickness.

HD Grade
Teslin HD(higher-Density) substrate is suitable for applications that required greater stiffness and tear resistance than what is provided by Teslin SP grade. However, Teslin HD still has similar printability to the Teslin SP grade.

TS Grade
Teslin TS is a thermally stabilized grade which is more resistant to shrinkage when exposed to elevated temperatures. This is best used for applications where fixed graphics are printed before digital or laser printing of variable data.

ID Cards
Teslin Paper is also used to make professional ID Cards by countries around the world. The paper is printed on using an inkjet printer or laser printer and then laminated and cut to a CR80 driver's license size. This technique does not require an ID card printer and is much more affordable.

References

External links
 Official website

Synthetic paper
Brand name materials
Products introduced in 1984
PPG Industries